Caldarola is a comune (municipality) in the Province of Macerata in the Italian region Marche, located about  southwest of Ancona and about  southwest of Macerata.

The town includes the Castello Pallotta (9th century, remade in the 16th century) and the Pallotta Palace (16th century). The communal territory is also home to several castles, such as those of Croce, Vestignano and Pievefavera. Notable is also the Collegiata di San Martino (1587).

References

Cities and towns in the Marche